Redux Orchestra versus Einstürzende Neubauten is the fourth release of Einstürzende Neubauten's Musterhaus project, a series of highly experimental CD releases that were only available via an annual subscription through their website or from shows during their 25th Anniversary Tour. This project was separate from their Neubauten.org Supporter Project, which ran concurrently.

The Musterhaus release saw Redux Orchestra and Einstürzende Neubauten collaborating to create new re-arrangements of songs from Einstürzende Neubauten's previous releases.

Track listing
 "Keine Schönheit ohne Gefahr" (from Fünf auf der nach oben offenen Richterskala) – 15:09
 "Wüste" (from Tabula Rasa) – 7:59
 "Installation No. 1" (from Ende Neu) – 10:14
 "Negativ Nein" (from Kollaps) – 2:14

Notes
All compositions by BB, NU, AH, MC, FM except Negativ Nein (BB, NU, FM).
All lyrics by BB.

Redux Orchestra:
Ari Benjamin Meyers - keyboards, musical director
Max Loderbauer - keyboards, electronics
Bettina Matt - sax, flute
Max Hacker - sax, bass clarinet
Kathrin Wagner - sax
Paul Brody - trumpet, flugelhorn
Rob Gutowski - trombone, alphorn
Jan Tilmann Schade - cello
Meta Hüper - violin

Members of Einstürzende Neubauten:
Blixa Bargeld - vocals
Alexander Hacke - bass
N.U. Unruh - percussion
Jochen Arbeit - guitar

The concert has been recorded live at Club Redux V on November 9, 2005 in Watergate (Berlin, Germany)
All arrangements by Ari Benjamin Meyers
Produced by Ari Benjamin Meyers and Einstürzende Neubauten
Mixed by Macro Paschke
Mastered by Boris Wilsdorf

External links 
Musterhaus Project website
Club Redux website
Ari Benjamin Meyers website

Einstürzende Neubauten albums
2006 albums